Anders Dahlin (born 5 April 1965) is a Swedish judoka. He competed at the 1988 Summer Olympics and the 1992 Summer Olympics.

References

External links
 

1965 births
Living people
Swedish male judoka
Olympic judoka of Sweden
Judoka at the 1988 Summer Olympics
Judoka at the 1992 Summer Olympics
People from Sundsvall
Sportspeople from Västernorrland County
20th-century Swedish people